Phalaenopsis × gersenii is a species of orchid native to Borneo and Sumatra. It is a natural hybrid of Phalaenopsis violacea and Phalaenopsis sumatrana. It is named after Gerrit Jan Gersen (1826-1877). He was a Dutch official, who was deployed to the Dutch East Indies, where he also was active as a plant collector of the Malesian region.

Taxonomy
Phalaenopsis × singuliflora has been viewed as a synonym of Phalaenopsis × gersenii. The other natural hybrid however involves Phalaenopsis bellina instead of Phalaenopsis violacea.

References 

gersenii
Orchid hybrids
Hybrid plants
Plant nothospecies
Interspecific plant hybrids
Plants described in 1892
Orchids of Borneo
Orchids of Sumatra
Orchids of Indonesia